The Mask Singer Myanmar is a singing competition television program presented by Paing Zay Ye Htun. It was based on the South Korea singing competition King of Mask Singer. Guessing mask celebrities were A Yine, Khine Thin Kyi, Htun Htun, Yadanar My.

Game format
Celebrities compete on the show anonymously by wearing costumes over a series of episodes. In each episode, some of the competitors are paired off into face-off competitions, in which each will perform a song of his or her choice in their real voice. From each face-off, the judges and live audience will vote for their favourites: the winner is safe for the week, while the loser is put up for elimination and then takes off their mask to reveal the identity.

Cast

Presenters
Key:
 Current presenter 
 Previous presenter

Judging panel

Key:
 Current judging panel
 Previous judge(s)

Contestants

Season 1

A Thin Cho Swe as "Dragon"
Paing Takhon as "Tiger"
Oak Soe Khant as "Alien"
Han Thi as "Owl"
Wai Gyi as "Zawgyi"
Po Po Heather as "Banana"
Aung Ye Htike as "Phoe Wa"
Lain Maw Thee as "Pineapple"
Kyaw Htoo as "Giant"
Min Maw Kun as "Anubis"
Kay Kay Moe as "Watermelon"
Sin Pauk as "Peacock"
Nay Nay as "Piggy"
Ma Htet as "Cat"
Ei Si Kway as "Puppet"
Nang Khin Zay Yar as "Ice-cream"
He Lay as "Pirate"
Aung Myint Myat as "Crow"

Series overview

References

External links

Burmese television series
MRTV (TV network) original programming
2019 television series debuts
Masked Singer